Bulletproof is the fifth studio album by the band Reckless Kelly. It was released on June 24, 2008. The album features tracks critical of and reflecting on recent sociopolitical unfoldings, such as the Iraq War and Hurricane Katrina.

Track listing 
 "Ragged as the Road" - 3:32
 "You Don't Have to Stay Forever" - 4:04
 "Love in Her Eyes" - 3:35
 "Passin' Through" - 3:11
 "I Never Had a Chance" - 3:05
 "One False Move" - 3:54
 "A Guy Like Me" - 3:02
 "American Blood" - 3:51
 "How Was California?" - 2:55
 "Mirage" - 4:00
 "Don't Say Goodbye" - 3:11
 "God Forsaken Town" - 4:12
 "Wandering Eye" - 3:06
 "Bulletproof" - 3:29

Radio Singles 
 "Ragged as the Road"
 "Love in Her Eyes"

Personnel 

 David Abeyta – acoustic guitar, percussion, electric guitar, editing, lap steel guitar
 James Bailey – publicity
 Cody Braun – fiddle, harmonica, mandolin, harmony vocals
 Willy Braun – acoustic guitar, percussion, electric guitar, harmony vocals
 Jim DeMain – mastering
 Bobby Huber – studio assistant
 Manfred Jerome – clapping
 Lloyd Maines – pedal steel
 Jimmy McFeeley – bass
 Jay Nazz – drums
 Adam Odor – editing, mixing
 Ephraim Owens - trumpet
 Michael Ramos – piano, organ (hammond), organ (pump), wurlitzer
 Fred Remmert – engineer
 John Smerek – engineer, mixing
 Brian Standefer – cello

Chart positions

References 

2008 albums
Reckless Kelly (band) albums